The Llanbedrog Volcanic Group is an Ordovician lithostratigraphic group (a sequence of rock strata) in northwest Wales. The name is derived from the village of Llanbedrog on the Llyn Peninsula where the strata are exposed.

Outcrops
This succession of rocks is exposed around the village of Llanbedrog and in a band stretching northwestwards inland.

Lithology and stratigraphy
The Group represents an assemblage of both volcanic rocks -  lavas, tuffs, breccias - and volcaniclastic sediments - mudstones, siltstones,  sandstones and conglomerates. It comprises (in descending order i.e. youngest first) the Yoke House Formation, the Carneddol Rhyolitic Tuff Formation, the Foel Ddu Formation and, at its base, the Penmaen Formation.

References

Ordovician System of Europe
Upper Ordovician Series
Geology of Gwynedd